Emmerich Rath (5 November 1883, Prague – 21 December 1962, Broumov) was a German Bohemian athlete who competed in the 1908 Summer Olympics and in the 1912 Summer Olympics for Austria.

Biography
Rath has been described as a "sporting all-rounder". He won the heavyweight boxing championship of Germany. He was a vegetarian from his youth.

In 1908 he finished 25th in the marathon race. He also participated in the 10 mile walk competition and was eliminated in the first round. Four years later he finished 33rd in the Olympic marathon race. He also participated in the cross country race but did not finish.

In 1914, he was part of the Czech ice hockey team at the European Championships in Berlin.

Rath competed in bodybuilding contests and was a pioneer skier.

References

External links
Vegetarian Sportsman Emerich Rath

1883 births
1962 deaths
Athletes (track and field) at the 1908 Summer Olympics
Athletes (track and field) at the 1912 Summer Olympics
Austrian male marathon runners
Austrian male long-distance runners
Austrian male racewalkers
Czech male boxers
Czech male long-distance runners
Czech male marathon runners
Czech male racewalkers
Olympic athletes of Austria
Olympic cross country runners
People associated with physical culture
Vegetarianism activists
Sportspeople from Prague